The R767 road is a regional road in Ireland which connects J7 (Bray South) of the N11 to Bray Town Hall on Bray Main Street. The majority of the road is known as the Killarney Road.

Route
The route begins at the Kilcroney Interchange (J7 Bray South/Greystones North), which is one of the busiest junctions in the country. The route crosses the N11 and meets the Ram Roundabout. The road then travels northwest towards Bray. The R767 passes through many of Bray's southwestern suburbs, such as Ballywaltrim, Oldcourt, Killarney and King Edward Road. The route terminates at its junction with the R761 at Bray Town Hall.

See also
Roads in Ireland
National primary road
National secondary road

References
Roads Act 1993 (Classification of Regional Roads) Order 2006 – Department of Transport

Regional roads in the Republic of Ireland
Roads in County Wicklow